Russell Barr Williamson (May 2, 1893 - October 3, 1964) was an American architect. He designed many buildings in Wisconsin, including the NRHP-listed Eagles Club in Milwaukee, and the NRHP-listed Anthony and Caroline Isermann House and Frank and Jane Isermann House in Kenosha.

Life
Williamson was born on May 2, 1893 in Royal Center, Indiana, and he grew up near Princeton, Kansas. He graduated from the Kansas State University and the School of the Art Institute of Chicago.

Williamson first worked as a draftsman for Frank Lloyd Wright in 1915-1917. He became an architect in Kansas City, Missouri until 1919, when he moved to Milwaukee, Wisconsin and he designed many houses. He also designed the NRHP-listed Eagles Club in Milwaukee, and the NRHP-listed Anthony and Caroline Isermann House and Frank and Jane Isermann House in Kenosha.

Williamson married Nola Mae Hawthorne, and they had a son and a daughter. Williamson died of a heart attack on October 3, 1964 in Oostburg, Wisconsin, at age 71.

References

1893 births
1964 deaths
Architects from Kansas
Architects from Wisconsin
Kansas State University alumni
People from Cass County, Indiana
People from Franklin County, Kansas
People from Oostburg, Wisconsin
School of the Art Institute of Chicago alumni
20th-century American architects